Robert Baldock (died 1327) was the Lord Privy Seal and Lord Chancellor of England.

Robert Baldock  may also refer to:

Robert Baldock (judge) (1624/5 – 1691), English judge
Bob Baldock (born 1937), US citizen who participated in Cuban Revolution

See also
 Robert Baldick (1927–1972), British academic